The Saeima is the parliament of the Republic of Latvia. It is a unicameral parliament consisting of 100 members who are elected by proportional representation, with seats allocated to political parties which gain at least 5% of the popular vote. Elections are scheduled to be held once every four years, normally on the first Saturday of October. The most recent elections were held in October 2022.

The President of Latvia can dismiss the Saeima and request early elections. The procedure for dismissing it involves substantial political risk to the president, including a risk of loss of office. On 28 May 2011 president Valdis Zatlers decided to initiate the dissolution of the Saeima, which was approved in a referendum, and the Saeima was dissolved on 23 July 2011.

The current Speaker of the Saeima is Edvards Smiltēns of the United List party.

History and etymology
The Saeima traces its origins to the Sejm of the Kingdom of Poland, which led to the creation of the Sejm (Seimas) of the Grand Duchy of Lithuania and later to the creation of the Sejm of the Polish–Lithuanian Commonwealth. Livonia, a part of the Polish–Lithuanian Commonwealth, was exposed to the Polish mode of administration and introduced to the Sejm-system. Most of today's Latvia, incorporated into 3 voivodeships: the Dorpat Voivodeship, the Parnawa Voivodeship and the Wenden Voivodeship, in total sent 6 senators to the Sejm of the Poland. However, the rest of Latvia belonged to the Duchy of Courland and Semigallia, which as a direct fief of the Commonwealth (therefore not a member of the Union with equal rights) was governed by the Sejm, but could not send its own senators to it.
Local councils called sejmik (little Sejm) stretched across all of Latvia.

The word sejm derives from the verb "sjąć się" meaning "to get together", with similar words in some other Slavic languages, of proto-Slavic origin *sъjęti < *sъjemti Sejm, then, as a noun meant "a gathering, a meeting, a council.”

In the 19th century, as the concept of nations began to emerge, Juris Alunāns, a member of a Latvian nationalist group called the Young Latvians, claimed ownership to the word "saeims". Despite the similar sound, similar semantic structure and clear historical connotations, he claimed that it was a purely Latvian word that he had invented. As mentioned earlier, the word bears a similar meaning: "a gathering, a meeting, a council". 
He claimed that the word he constructed stemmed from the archaic Latvian word eima instead, meaning "to go" (derived from the PIE *ei "to go" and also a cognate with the Ancient Greek eimi, Gaulish , among others).

He could not explain, however, how the s- prefix got added to the word, and what sense this addition made within the limits of the Latvian language. Nevertheless, according to Alunāns, the word is purely Latvian and completely independent of the aforementioned historical context. However, the prefix sa- to a verb in modern Latvian language usually stands for a complete action and the word "Saeima" can stand for a meaning "let's gather together completely".

In the pre-war Latvia, the Saeima was elected for three-year terms. The 1st Saeima met from 7 November 1922 to 2 November 1925, the 2nd from 3 November 1925 to 5 November 1928, the 3rd from 6 November 1928 to 2 November 1931, and the 4th from 3 November 1931 to 15 May 1934 (date of the Latvian coup d'état).

Elections

The Saeima is an entirely elected body. All Latvian citizens (including naturalized citizens) over the age of 18 are eligible to vote. Candidates must be qualified to vote, but must also be over 21, must not be former employees of the USSR, Latvian SSR, or affiliated organizations, must not have been convicted of a criminal offence or deemed to be of diminished mental capacity.

The term of the Saeima is four years. An election may be called early, but doing so is more complicated than in other parliamentary democracies. If the President proposes that the Saeima be dissolved, a national referendum must be held to confirm the dissolution. If the dissolution is not approved, the President is removed from office. If one-tenth of the electorate signs a petition demanding a dissolution, a referendum can be held without the involvement of the President.

There are five constituencies, Kurzeme (12 deputies), Latgale (14), Riga (35), Vidzeme (25), and Zemgale (14). Overseas votes are counted for the Riga constituency.

Seats are distributed in each constituency by open list proportional representation among the parties that overcome a 5% national election threshold using an unmodified version of the Webster/Sainte-Laguë method.

Voters cast a vote for a party list, which consists of the candidates that the party has submitted in that constituency. Although a specific ordering is listed for each candidate, which is determined by the party, this has no effect on the actual chances of each candidate. Instead, voters cast "specific votes" for candidates. These votes can be either positive votes or negative votes. The number of votes for each candidate is determined by taking the number of votes for the respective list, and adding it to the candidate's positive votes, before subtracting the number of negative votes for that candidate. The candidates with the highest number of votes fill the party's seats. A positive vote is indicated by drawing a plus sign (+) next to the candidate's name on the ballot paper. A negative vote is indicated by crossing out the candidate's name. Voters may only cast specific votes for the candidates on the list that they voted for.

It is uncommon for any party to achieve more than 30% of the vote in an election. The record is 32.4% for the Latvian Way party in the 1993 election. This means that a coalition has always been necessary.

If a seat falls vacant during a term of the Saeima, it is filled by the next candidate on the appropriate list.

The Communist Party of Latvia is the only political party that is banned.

Most recent election

Summary of the 1 October 2022 Latvian Saeima election results

See also
Category:Deputies of the Saeima
Deputies of the Saeima
List of Deputy Speakers of the Saeima
People's Council of Latvia - provisional parliament from 1918-1920
Constitutional Assembly of Latvia - consented to the Satversme in 1922

Notes

References

External links
Latvijas Republikas Saeima
Central Election Commission of Latvia

 
Latvia
Latvia
Latvia
1922 establishments in Latvia